The Ford Parts and Accessories Depot of Edmonton, Alberta, Canada is a historic building in the neighborhood of Huff Bremner Estate. In 2006, the building was added to the Edmonton Inventory of Historic Sites on the basis of its modern architecture.

History 
The Ford Parts and Accessories Depot of Edmonton began construction in 1956 and was opened in 1957. Canadian architect David Murray has written that the building "opened to much fanfare in 1957 [and] remains a refined example of the light industrial expression of the International Style. Shortly after its opening, the Edmonton Fords Parts and Accessories Depot was selected to host a national Ford conference. Because of this conference, the Edmonton Journal reported that Edmonton was the first Canadian city to see the Ford models of 1957.

Architecture 
The building was designed by Canadian architect Kelvin Crawford Stanley who also designed the Edmonton City Hall of 1957 (which has since been demolished). In 1957, Edmonton's Ford Parts and Accessories Depot exemplified an industrial building employing the Early Modern variation of the International Style of modern architecture. This was characterized most clearly by the building's low level appearance with a level rooftop and a large distribution center situated behind a smaller front office. The building also features continuous flat strip windows, red brickwork beneath the windows, and garden-like landscaping on the South side of the building.

Recognition 
The opening of the Ford Parts and Accessories Depot was reported on in the National Post and the Windsor Star. In 2006, the building was added to the Edmonton Inventory of Historic Sites on the basis of its modern architecture.

Sale and current usage 
In 1992, the Edmonton Journal begin speculating that Ford would relocate its parts depot to Calgary. In 1993, the historic Ford Parts and Accessories Depot was officially relocated to a larger building; however, the depot remained in Edmonton and simply changed neighborhoods, from its original site in Huff Bremner Estate to 11604 181 Street in Edmiston Industrial. In 1994, the original building reopened as a Real Canadian Wholesale Club.

Landscaping 
In 2010, architectural historian David Murray celebrated the building's "landscaped park-like setting along 111 Avenue." The south face of the building features shrubberies and lawn ornaments such as boulders that function as a rock garden. The professionally landscaped region of the property is bisected by a side road.

See also 
Architecture of Canada
List of historic places in the Edmonton Capital Region

References 

1957 establishments in Alberta
History of Edmonton
Industrial buildings completed in 1956
Manufacturing buildings and structures
Manufacturing plants in Canada
Modernist architecture in Canada